Otamatea County was one of the counties of New Zealand in the North Island, from 1887 until 1989. It was created by the Counties Act 1886, which came into effect on 1 January 1887, from parts of the existing Hobson, Rodney and Whangarei Counties. The county seat was at Paparoa. In the 1989 local government reforms, Otamatea County merged with Dargaville Borough, Hobson County and parts of Rodney County and Whangarei County to create Kaipara District.

See also 
 List of former territorial authorities in New Zealand § Counties

References

Counties of New Zealand
Politics of the Northland Region